The 1966–67 season was Dinamo Zagreb's 21st season in the Yugoslav First League. It was the second season that the league was played in a 30-round format after it had been expanded from 15 to 16 clubs in the 1965–66 season.

Dinamo finished runners-up in the league, with two points behind champions FK Sarajevo. They were also knocked out in the 1967–68 Yugoslav Cup by the same team, losing 1–0 in the Round of 16. However, it proved to be the club's most successful season in history in terms of European competitions, as they won the 1966–67 Inter-Cities Fairs Cup, beating England's Leeds United in the two-legged final 2–0 on aggregate.

This was Dinamo's second final in the competition, having lost the 1963 final to Spanish side Valencia four years earlier. It was also the first and only European trophy won by a Yugoslav club until Red Star Belgrade's triumph in the 1990–91 European Cup 24 years later.

Slaven Zambata was the club's top league scorer with 13 goals in 23 matches, and goalkeeper Marijan Brnčić was the only player who appeared in all 30 league matches for the Blues. In addition, Zambata also scored 6 goals in the Inter-Cities Fairs Cup, which meant he shared second place in the competition's goalscoring table (along with Burnley's Andy Lochhead and Eintracht Frankfurt's Oskar Lotz) behind Flórián Albert of Ferencváros.

Players

Squad
The following is the full list of players who appeared in league matches for Dinamo in the 1966–67 season. Although Marijan Čerček did not appear in any of the 1966–67 league matches, he did appear for Dinamo in the Inter-Cities Fairs Cup.

Statistics
The following table lists appearances and goals of all players who represented Dinamo in the 1966–67 season. Only league matches and goals are taken into account.

First League

Matches

Classification

Inter-Cities Fairs Cup

See also
1966–67 Yugoslav First League
1966–67 Inter-Cities Fairs Cup

References

External links
1966–67 Yugoslav First League final tables at Rec.Sport.Soccer Statistics Foundation
1966–67 Inter-Cities Fairs Cup details at Rec.Sport.Soccer Statistics Foundation

1967-67
Yugoslav football clubs 1966–67 season